John P. McKinney is a former Republican member of the Connecticut Senate, representing the 28th district from 1999 until 2015, and served as its Minority Leader from June 2007 until 2014. He was a candidate for governor in 2014, receiving enough delegates during the convention to qualify for an August primary.  McKinney's 2014 campaign was particularly focused on reducing the size of government, decreasing tax burden, and growing the economy. He was defeated in the 2014 Republican primary by Tom Foley.

He was succeeded as Connecticut Senate Minority Leader by Len Fasano.

McKinney considered running for Congress in 2010 in Connecticut's 4th congressional district against incumbent Democratic Congressman Jim Himes.

McKinney is the son of Stewart B. McKinney, a former Congressman for the Fourth Congressional District in Connecticut. He is also the grandson of Briggs Cunningham.

McKinney is currently out of politics and practices law in Fairfield, Connecticut.

References

External links

Bills introduced by John P. McKinney
Project Vote Smart - Representative John P. McKinney (CT) profile
Follow the Money - John P McKinney
2006 2004 2002 2000 1998 campaign contributions

1964 births
Republican Party Connecticut state senators
Living people
People from Southport, Connecticut